Coleophora minipalpella is a moth of the family Coleophoridae. It is found in Spain.

References

minipalpella
Moths described in 1998
Moths of Europe